Visa requirements for Armenian citizens are administrative entry restrictions by the authorities of other states placed on citizens of Armenia. As of 16 January 2022, Armenian citizens had visa-free or visa on arrival access to 65 countries and territories, ranking the Armenian passport 78th in terms of travel freedom according to the  Henley Passport Index.



Visa requirements

Artsakh

 Armenian citizens do not need visas to enter the disputed region of the Republic of Artsakh.

Recent Changes
On 2 May 2002, Brazil lifted visa requirements for the citizens of Armenia. 
On 28 June 2006, Ecuador lifted visa requirements for the citizens of Armenia. 
On 23 June 2008, Bolivia lifted visa requirements for the citizens of Armenia. 
On 1 August 2009, Belarus lifted visa requirements for the citizens of Armenia.  
On 17 November 2009, Russia lifted visa requirements for the citizens of Armenia. 
On 13 July 2010, Jamaica introduced a visa on arrival for the citizens of Armenia.  
On 16 October 2010, Haiti lifted visa requirements for the citizens of Armenia.  
On 12 December 2010, Dominica lifted visa requirements for the citizens of Armenia 
On 18 February 2011, Singapore introduced E-visa for the citizens of Armenia.
On 27 February 2011, Micronesia lifted visa requirements for the citizens of Armenia.
On 5 April 2011, Antigua and Berduda lifted visa requirements for the citizens of Armenia. 
On 10 May 2011, Moldova lifted visa requirements for the citizens of Armenia. 
On 12 July 2011, Ukraine lifted visa requirements for the citizens of Armenia.  
On 15 September 2011, Argentina lifted visa requirements for the citizens of Armenia. 
On 12 November 2012, Lebanon lifted visa requirements for the citizens of Armenia. 
On 3 July 2013, Georgia lifted visa requirements for the citizens of Armenia.  
On 18 September 2013, Namibia lifted visa requirements for the citizens of Armenia.  
On 20 December 2013, Saint Vincent and The Grenadines lifted visa requirements for the citizens of Armenia.  
On 9 July 2014, Uruguay lifted visa requirements for the citizens of Armenia. 
On 14 October 2014, Jordan lifted visa requirements for the citizens of Armenia. 
On 15 August 2015, India introduced E-visa for the citizens of Armenia.  
On 7 October 2015, Indonesia lifted visa requirements for the citizens of Armenia.  
On 10 November 2015, Malaysia lifted visa requirements for the citizens of Armenia.  
In 2016, Iran lifted visa requirements for the citizens of Armenia.
On June 12, 2017, Ethiopia introduced E-visa for the citizens of Armenia.
On 23 June 2017, Qatar lifted visa requirements for the citizens of Armenia. 
On 14 August 2017, Bahamas lifted visa requirements for the citizens of Armenia. 
On 15 March 2017 the Ex-President of Armenia, Serzh Sargsyan announced that Armenia will launch talks with the European Union over establishing visa-free travel for Armenian citizens into the EU's Schengen Area soon.
 On 23 March 2017 The United Arab Emirates and Armenia agreed on exempting citizens of both countries from visas, as they will be given visas on arrival at the airport.
On 20 April 2017, Montenegro lifted visa requirements for the citizens of Armenia.
On 16 March 2018, Albania lifted visa requirements for the citizens of Armenia.
 On 1 May 2018 the newly appointed Prime Minister of Armenia, Nikol Pashinyan announced that Armenian citizens would be able to travel within the EU’s Schengen Area visa-free in the nearest future.
 On 24 August 2018 the  Chancellor of Germany, Angela Merkel during her meeting with the Prime Minister of Armenia Nikol Pashinyan said “Georgian and Ukrainian citizens don’t need visa to enter the European Union, and we will do everything possible to reach visa liberalisation with Armenia as well.”
On 25 April 2019, Tanzania introduced E-visa for the citizens for Armenia. 
On 2 August 2019, Madagascar introduced a visa on arrival for the citizens of Armenia.  
On 1 March 2020, Serbia lifted visa requirements for the citizens of Armenia. 
On 20 July 2020, China lifted visa requirements for the citizens of Armenia.
On 13 September 2020, South Sudan introduced E-visa for the citizens of Armenia.
On 20 January 2021, Oman lifted visa requirements for the citizens of Armenia.

Non-visa restrictions

See also

 Armenian diaspora
 Armenian passport
 Foreign relations of Armenia
 Largest Armenian diaspora communities
 List of nationalities forbidden at border
 Visa policy of Armenia
 Visa requirements for Artsakh citizens

References and notes
References

Notes

Armenia
Foreign relations of Armenia